The 2021 Copa CONMEBOL Libertadores was the 62nd edition of the CONMEBOL Libertadores (also referred to as the Copa Libertadores), South America's premier club football tournament organized by CONMEBOL.

Starting from this season, teams must be in the top division of their member association to play in South American club competitions, except for teams which are champions of the qualifying tournaments or cups.

On 14 May 2020, CONMEBOL announced the candidate venues for the 2021, 2022 and 2023 club competition finals. On 13 May 2021, CONMEBOL announced that the final would be played at the Estadio Centenario in Montevideo, Uruguay on 20 November 2021, but on 27 July 2021 the final was eventually confirmed to have been rescheduled to 27 November 2021.

Defending champions Palmeiras won their third Copa Libertadores title after beating fellow Brazilian club Flamengo by a 2–1 score after extra time in the final match. As winners of the 2021 Copa Libertadores, Palmeiras qualified for the 2021 FIFA Club World Cup, and earned the right to play against the winners of the 2021 Copa Sudamericana in the 2022 Recopa Sudamericana. They also automatically qualified for the 2022 Copa Libertadores group stage.

Teams
The following 47 teams from the 10 CONMEBOL member associations qualified for the tournament:
Copa Libertadores champions
Copa Sudamericana champions
Brazil: 7 berths
Argentina: 6 berths
All other associations: 4 berths each

The entry stage is determined as follows:
Group stage: 28 teams
Copa Libertadores champions
Copa Sudamericana champions
Teams which qualified for berths 1–5 from Argentina and Brazil
Teams which qualified for berths 1–2 from all other associations
Second stage: 13 teams
Teams which qualified for berths 6–7 from Brazil
Team which qualified for berth 6 from Argentina
Teams which qualified for berths 3–4 from Chile and Colombia
Teams which qualified for berth 3 from all other associations
First stage: 6 teams
Teams which qualified for berth 4 from Bolivia, Ecuador, Paraguay, Peru, Uruguay and Venezuela

Notes

Schedule
The schedule of the competition will be as follows:

On 4 February 2021, CONMEBOL announced a rescheduling for the qualifying stages.

Draws

Qualifying stages

First stage

Second stage

Third stage

Group stage

Group A

Group B

Group C

Group D

Group E

Group F

Group G

Group H

Final stages

Qualified teams
The winners and runners-up of each of the eight groups in the group stage advanced to the round of 16.

Seeding

Bracket

Round of 16

Quarter-finals

Semi-finals

Final

Statistics

Top scorers

Team of the tournament
The CONMEBOL technical study group selected the following 11 players as the team of the tournament.

See also
2021 Copa Sudamericana

References

External links
CONMEBOL Libertadores 2021, CONMEBOL.com

 
2021
1